"I'm Not Sayin' is a song written by Gordon Lightfoot. It was recorded in December 1964 and released as a single A-side in 1965 and on his 1966 debut album Lightfoot!. The lyrics detail the singer's promise: not that he can necessarily love the subject, or be true to the subject, but only that he can try to do so. The single peaked at #12 in Canada in June 1965.  Cash Box described it as "a rhythmic, folkish ode about a guy who refuses to make any romantic promises to his girlfriend."

In late May 1965, Nico recorded a version of the song released on Immediate Records. Her version is stylistically reminiscent of the work of Marianne Faithfull. The single only garnered limited success. This version of the song features Jimmy Page, then a studio musician, on the 12-string guitar. Nico's version was produced by Page as well, and the promo film was shot at West India Docks in London.

Other artists who have recorded this song include James Booker, Turley Richards, Ian Campbell Folk Group, and The Replacements.

On Lightfoot's 1975 platinum compilation LP Gord's Gold, the song appears in a re-recorded medley with "Ribbon of Darkness". Lightfoot's 1969 live album Sunday Concert also features a medley of the two songs.

Nico's version was one of the Desert Island Discs chosen by former Smiths frontman Morrissey on the show broadcast 29 November 2009 on BBC Radio Four.

The reformed version of The Replacements recorded a version of the song for their 2013 release, Songs for Slim, to benefit their former guitarist, Slim Dunlap.

References 

1965 singles
Gordon Lightfoot songs
Songs written by Gordon Lightfoot
Nico songs
Immediate Records singles
1965 songs